Gcina is an African given name. Notable people with the name include:

Gcina Mazibuko (born 1983), Swaziland footballer striker
Gcina Mhlope (born 1958), South African anti-apartheid activist, actress, storyteller, poet, and playwright
Gcina Nkosi (born 1949), South African actress

African given names